Baliochila pringlei is a butterfly in the family Lycaenidae. It is found in Tanzania (Usambara). Its habitat consists of montane forests.

References

Butterflies described in 1967
Poritiinae
Endemic fauna of Tanzania
Butterflies of Africa